The World Sculling Championship (1863–1957), evolved from the Championship of the Thames for professional scullers.

Only the sport of boxing claims an older Championship of the World. It is notable that Jack Broughton, the "Father of Boxing", trained scullers for prize contests which had their roots in wager races which had taken place from the middle of the 18th century on the Thames.

History

The first race for the Professional Championship of the Thames took place between Westminster and Hammersmith, on the River Thames in London in September 1831, when John Williams of Waterloo Bridge challenged Charles Campbell of Westminster for the Sculling Championship of the Thames. This was just over a year after the first Wingfield Sculls race for the Amateur Championship of the Thames had been held.

The race was initially dominated by oarsmen from the Thames, but a fierce rivalry soon arose between Newcastle and London after the famous Tyne sculler, Robert Chambers became the first non-Londoner to secure the title in 1859.

In 1863 the race became for the Championship of the World. when it had its first non-British entrant, Australian Richard A W Green. Green lost to Chambers but changes were afoot and as an increasing number of professional scullers from Australia; the US and Canada started to compete, Britain lost its dominance, failing to secure a win between 1876 and 1920. For details of the subsequent English Championship only see English Sculling Championship.

The first overseas sculler to claim the title, was Australian Edward Trickett, who won his first race in June 1876, Trickett held the title for the next two races (1877 and 1879), both of which were held on his home river, the Parramatta. Trickett eventually lost out to Canadian Ned Hanlan (the first sculler to use a boat with a sliding seat), in 1880 on the Championship Course on the Thames. This course was over a distance of a little over four miles but for other races on other courses there was no set distance. These other courses varied between three and five miles approximately.

Professional sculling saw a marked downturn with each of the world wars. Although a few races were held after the 2nd World War, they failed to arouse the interest of the public or attract the standard of competitor seen in the earlier years of the Championship, and as the amateur / professional split in rowing was slowly abolished, the race died out. The Title lapsed in 1958 when Evans Fischer retired undefeated.

The 1908 World Title race was commemorated in December 2008 when Olympic champion Olaf Tufte defeated three time World Champion Mahé Drysdale and wild card race winner Hamish Bond on New Zealand's Whanganui River to take home the $5000 cash prize.

Challenges 

A person wanting to become the champion would issue a formal challenge to the existing Champion for a match and would offer a certain sum of money. Sometimes a person would issue a newspaper challenge to the winner of another match and deposit a sum with the paper which would theoretically 'bind' the subsequent match. The stake was not a fixed amount but it had to be high enough to be worth the champion's time and reputation and which would discourage frivolous challenges. Typically the stake would be £100 or £200 a side for a state or national championship and £500 or more each for the world title. Sometimes additional expenses were expected as well. Under the rules such as they were, the Champion would have three months to accept the challenge or else forfeit the match in favour of the challenger.

The challenger and Champion, or their agents, discussed the 'terms' and came to an agreement. Sometimes challenges failed at this stage as there was no agreement or the challenger was unable to raise the money. Once the challenge was accepted the 'articles' would be drawn up and signed by the contestants and witnessed. The articles would state where and when the match was to be held, who the umpire was to be, how much the stake per side was to be and when it was to be paid in, and who the literal stake-holder was to be, and a few other details. From time to time it was agreed that the loser would receive some money as expenses which at least prevented a total loss. The stake-holder was often the Editor of a newspaper. The race was then supposed to run within another six months.

Seldom did challengers or Champions have to put up their own money in these sorts of competitions. The normal arrangement was that wealthy backers would put up the money. The backers were usually syndicates of gambling men. The backers of the winner of the match got their money back, and collected any other bets placed, but the winning man personally got the money put up from the backers of the loser. Side-bets between the actual contestants themselves were not unknown. Contestants were also often rewarded by splitting the 'gate.' i.e. the profit from sales of boat tickets and souvenirs. The nature of sculling meant that not all spectators could be charged to see the race but a split of sixty-forty to the winner was common.

Betting

Professional scullers tended to attract more media attention than the crews, since their individuality gave the media and public a greater chance of recognition. "The Aquatic Oracle" published in London in 1852 lists hundreds and hundreds of professional races from 1835 to 1851 between watermen. While many were for small sums of money it gives an indication of the extent of the activity. Betting on races was widespread and in the late 19th century, sculling or wager racing was perhaps the greatest spectator sport in London at the time. Many tens of thousands of spectators attended each race. By the turn of the century prize money had become so great that some scullers made up to nearly £5,000 a year in prizes and side bets, and £2,000 for a race.

Betting was simplified by recourse to past performances and present form would be followed by hordes of spectators at training sessions.

Boats 

The very earliest races were informal events between working watermen who raced in their everyday work boat or wherry. These rowing boats were used to carry passengers and goods from one part of the river to another. As
racing became more formalised the work boats were superseded by specialist racing craft. Several technical developments assisted in this transformation from the job of waterman to the sport of rowing. These were;

(1) the development of light weight boats built solely for racing.

(2) the outrigger which placed the oar's pivot point outside the boat allowing for more leverage.

(3) the swivelling rowlock, and

(4) the sliding seat which also allowed for more oar movement.
These developments greatly increased the average speed of racing. Generally in contemporary reports these types of boats were referred to as "outriggers," "best and best," or "wager boats."

Fouls

A foul is the touching of any part of an opponent's boat or sculls by any part of your own boat or sculls. In the early days of professional rowing, fouling an opponent was an accepted part of the game as a contestant would often deliberately foul to gain an advantage. As racing boats became lighter and frailer this practise became less and less accepted and was finally done away with as actual rowing skill was counted as more important than disabling the opposition. 
Later title or money matches outlawed fouling and generally the man doing the fouling lost the match. However, because contestants faced the opposite way to the way the boat travelled, accidental fouls sometimes occurred particularly as races were often held on rivers that had bends in them. No lanes were marked out as in modern courses and in a close race a foul could happen as both men tried to get around the bend as  quickly as possible. It was not unknown for a contestant to engineer a foul against himself to thereby try to win the race. 
In most matches an umpire or referee would rule on these sorts of fouls as to whose fault it was, usually at the time, but sometimes only after the race had finished. From time to time he would decide that the foul was accidental with no advantage to either sculler, and would order the men to continue racing. Many races were decided on fouls rather than who was the better sculler and many men felt hard done by when the decision went against them. The umpire's decision was final.

Results

Notes:
Bill Beach, Bobby Pearce and Evans Fischer all retired undefeated. 
James Renforth died while champion. Sadler later rowed for an open title.
Peter Kemp gained the title twice other than by races; once by formal forfeit from Beach, once upon the death of H Searle.
Richard Arnst gained the title once other than by a race; on the forfeiture of E Barry.
Charles Towns ad Bill McDevitt both held the title by the forfeiture of George Towns and Jim Paddon respectively. Neither successfully defended it.
R Chambers & E Paddon either gained the title once each by forfeit, or alternatively, one of their races was for an open title after the retirement of the holder.

References

Further reading
 Whitehead, Ian, "The Sporting Tyne", 2002, .
 Collins, Tony, "Encyclopedia of traditional British rural Sports", 2005
 Wigglesworth, Neil, "A Social History of English Rowing",
 World rowing history - professional racing
 http://www.graftonrowing.asn.au/history/stanbury_home.htm for details of Jim Stanbury
 http://www.westernsydneylibraries.nsw.gov.au/westernsydney/peter.html for details of Peter Kemp
 http://www.cshof.ca/hm_profile.php?i=190 for details of Jake Gaudaur, Sr.
 http://www.nswrowers.com/history-gc.html for details of George Cook

Rowing in the United Kingdom
Sport in Newcastle upon Tyne
Sport on the River Thames
River Tyne
History of rowing
Rowing in Australia
Rowing in New Zealand
Rowing in Canada
Rowing competitions
Water sports in London
1831 establishments
Recurring sporting events disestablished in 1957